Andre Sothern Holland, born to Douglas and Eva Holland, was a Farmer and Politician in Southern Rhodesia (Zimbabwe from 1979) in the 1970s and 1980s.

Personal life 
Holland had three children in Rhodesia with his wife Susan Jessica (Browning) Holland: Michael, Jane and Anne.

His South African grandfather, Arthur Herbert was personal secretary to Cecil Rhodes

His South African grandmother, Madeleine Holland, was a Poet and Academic who studied the Bantu of modern-day of central and Southern Africa.

Career 
As well as farming, a skill passed on to his son, Holland was also a passionate politician.

Described as a "prominent member of Parliament" in April, 1981, Andre started his political career as an MP under Ian Smith's Government in 1970. He was known to believe in closing the wealth and land ownership gap between the white and black populations of Rhodesia.

Following the change of geographic political boundaries (in which Southern Rhodesia became Zimbabwe) in 1979, Andre split from Ian Smith's party, the Rhodesian Front, to form an alternative. On April 21, 1981, The New York Times described this new party to be one more suited for the "liberal whites" of Zimbabwe.

Following his resignation from the Rhodesian Front due to differing values, Holland noticed much support form his constituents, leading to the formation of the new party, the Democratic Party. He announced he planned to challenge the Rhodesian Front in upcoming elections. However, after a year of campaigning and three lost elections, the Democratic Party was disbanded.

References 

Zimbabwean farmers
Zimbabwean politicians
1931 births
2014 deaths